MMA Creative is a marketing, advertising and public relations agency headquartered in Nashville, Tennessee, with an office in Cookeville as well.

History 
MMA Creative was founded in 1991 by Mike McCloud, who returned to the Upper Cumberland after graduating from the University of Tennessee to start Cookeville's Finest, a magazine celebrating the rural city's people and places. The advertising and marketing agency, then known as McCloud Graphics, started small and showed steady growth for several years. The name was changed to McCloud Marketing to better reflect the company's focus.

In 1999, the agency merged with Jesse Kaufman & Associates. The merger brought with it a new name (McCloud Marketing Associates) and new creative. Kaufman had been developing advertising and marketing campaigns in Cookeville and the Upper Cumberland for 20 years. Another merger occurred in 2001, when MMA (as it was often called) acquired Sparta-based Adeas Graphics. The agency changed its name yet again, this time to MMA Creative.

By 2004, MMA Creative had built up a strong enough client base out of Nashville that McCloud decided to open a Nashville office. In 2005, long-time political strategist and marketing executive Mike Kopp was hired to head-up the Nashville operation.

References 

Advertising agencies of the United States